Vincent Kennedy McMahon (born August 24, 1945) is an American businessman, media proprietor, and professional wrestling promoter. He is the majority owner and executive chairman of WWE, the world's largest professional wrestling company, having previously served as its chairman and CEO for 40 years. He is also the founder and owner of Alpha Entertainment, which he established in 2017 to oversee the 2020 revival of the XFL American football league.

McMahon graduated from East Carolina University with a degree in business in 1968, and began his tenure in professional wrestling as a commentator for WWE (then called the World Wide Wrestling Federation or WWWF) for most of the 1970s; he bought the company from his father, Vincent J. McMahon, in 1982 and almost monopolized the industry, which previously operated as separate entities across the United States. This led to the development of the annual event WrestleMania, which became one of the most successful professional wrestling events. WWE faced industry competition from World Championship Wrestling (WCW) in the 1990s before purchasing and absorbing WCW in 2001. WWE also purchased the assets of the defunct Extreme Championship Wrestling (ECW) in 2003.

McMahon has embarked on a number of WWE-related ventures. In 2014, he launched the WWE Network, a subscription video on-demand over-the-top streaming service. He also owns other WWE multimedia subsidiaries and a professional wrestling training facility. Outside of wrestling, he joint-owned and operated the XFL American football league twice; both the 2001 and 2020 iterations folded after a single season. He also headed the short-lived World Bodybuilding Federation and co-owns the clothing brand Tapout.

McMahon has appeared on-screen for WWE since 1969, initially as a personable play-by-play commentator. In 1997, he adopted the character of Mr. McMahon, portrayed as an irascible, villainous, swaggering tyrant who obsessed over maintaining control of his company and often growled the catchphrase "you're fired!" when dismissing an employee. Under the Mr. McMahon gimmick, which is considered by some to be WWE's greatest villainous character, he competed in some wrestling matches and became a one-time WWE Champion, a one-time ECW Champion, a Royal Rumble winner, and a multi-time pay-per-view headliner.

Following claims of hush-money agreements McMahon paid over alleged affairs with former WWE employees, McMahon stepped down as CEO and chairman of WWE in June 2022, pending the conclusion of an internal investigation; he was replaced by his daughter, Stephanie McMahon. The following month, he announced his retirement from WWE, but his return to WWE as executive chairman was confirmed in January 2023.

Early life 
Vincent Kennedy McMahon was born in Pinehurst, North Carolina, on August 24, 1945, the son of Victoria (née Hanner; 1920–2022) and Vincent James McMahon (1914–1984), who left the family when McMahon was still a baby and took McMahon's older brother Roderick James McMahon III (1943–2021) with him. McMahon did not meet his father until the age of 12. McMahon's paternal grandfather was the boxing promoter Roderick James "Jess" McMahon, whose parents were Irish immigrants from County Galway.

His paternal grandmother, Rose Davis, was also of Irish descent. McMahon was raised under the name Vinnie Lupton and spent the majority of his childhood living with his mother and various stepfathers. He later claimed that one of his stepfathers, Leo Lupton, beat his mother and attacked him when he tried to protect her; he said of the experience, "It is unfortunate that [Lupton] died before I could kill him. I would have enjoyed that." He graduated in 1964 from Fishburne Military School in Waynesboro, Virginia, where he reportedly struggled due to dyslexia.

Business career

Early business dealings
McMahon first met the promoter for Capitol Wrestling Corporation (CWC), his father, Vincent J. McMahon, when 12. At that point, McMahon became interested in following his father's professional wrestling footsteps and often accompanied him on trips to Madison Square Garden. McMahon wanted to be a wrestler, but his father did not allow him, explaining that promoters did not appear on the show and should stay apart from their wrestlers.

In 1968, McMahon graduated from East Carolina University with a business degree and after a nondescript career as a traveling salesman, he was eager to assume a managerial role in his father's World Wide Wrestling Federation promotion. In 1969, McMahon made his debut as a ring announcer for the WWWF's All-Star Wrestling. In 1971, he was assigned to a small territory in Maine, where he promoted his first card. He later became the play-by-play commentator for television matches after replacing Ray Morgan in 1971, a role he regularly maintained until November 1997.

In the 1970s, McMahon became prominent force in his father's company and, over the next decade, assisted his father in tripling TV syndication. The younger McMahon was also behind the Muhammad Ali versus Antonio Inoki match of 1976. He pushed for the renaming of the company to the World Wrestling Federation (WWF) in 1979.

On February 21, 1980, McMahon officially founded Titan Sports and the company's headquarters were established in South Yarmouth, Massachusetts, using the now-defunct Cape Cod Coliseum as a home base for the company. McMahon then became chairman of the company and his wife, Linda, became the "co-chief executive". In 1982, Titan acquired control of the CWC from McMahon's ailing father (who died in May 1984).

World Wrestling Federation/World Wrestling Entertainment/WWE (1982–present)

Purchase and 1980s wrestling boom 

When he purchased the WWF in 1982, professional wrestling was a business run by regional promotions. Various promoters understood that they would not invade each other's territories, as this practice had gone on undeterred for decades; McMahon had a different vision of what the industry could become. In 1983, the WWF split from the National Wrestling Alliance a second time, after initially splitting from them in 1963 before rejoining them in 1971. The NWA became the governing body for all the regional territories across the country and as far away as Japan.

He began expanding the company nationally by promoting in areas outside of the company's Northeast U.S. stomping grounds and by signing talent from other companies, such as the American Wrestling Association (AWA). In 1984, he recruited Hulk Hogan to be the WWF's charismatic new megastar, and the two quickly drew the ire of industry peers as the promotion began traveling and broadcasting into rival territories. McMahon, who still also fronted as the WWF's squeaky clean babyface announcer, created The Rock 'n' Wrestling Connection by incorporating pop music stars into wrestling storylines.

As a result, the WWF was able to expand its fanbase into a national mainstream audience as the promotion was featured heavily on MTV programming. On March 31, 1985, he ran the first WrestleMania at Madison Square Garden, available on closed circuit television in various markets throughout the United States. McMahon's success of birthing WrestleMania in the 1980s had a significant impact on the 1980s professional wrestling boom during the Golden Age Era.

During the late 1980s, McMahon shaped the WWF into a unique sports entertainment brand that reached out to family audiences while attracting fans who hadn't paid attention to pro wrestling before. By directing his storylines toward highly publicized supercards, McMahon capitalized on a fledgling revenue stream by promoting these events live on pay-per-view television. In 1987, the WWF reportedly drew 93,173 fans to the Pontiac Silverdome (which was called the "biggest crowd in sports-entertainment history") for WrestleMania III, which featured the main event of Hulk Hogan vs. André the Giant.

Business decline and the Attitude Era 

In 1993, the company entered the New Generation Era, one of McMahon's toughest times since taking over the company as business went up and down with various projects in the company.

After struggling against Ted Turner's World Championship Wrestling (WCW), McMahon cemented the WWF as the preeminent wrestling promotion in the late 1990s when initiating a new brand strategy that eventually returned the WWF to prominence. Sensing a public shift toward a more hardened and cynical fan base, McMahon redirected storylines towards a more adult-oriented model. The concept became known as "WWF Attitude" and McMahon commenced the new era when manipulating the WWF Championship away from Bret Hart at Survivor Series (now known as the "Montreal Screwjob").

McMahon, who, for years, had downplayed his ownership of the company and was mostly known as a commentator, became involved in WWF storylines as the evil Mr. McMahon, who began a legendary feud with Stone Cold Steve Austin, who challenged his authority. As a result, the WWF suddenly found itself back in national pop-culture, drawing millions of viewers for its weekly Monday Night Raw broadcasts, which ranked among the highest-rated shows on cable television. In October 1999, McMahon led the WWF in an initial public offering of company stock. Also, during the Attitude Era, the company embraced this period by incorporating foul language, graphic violence, and controversial stipulations such as Bra and Panties matches.

Monday Night Wars and acquisition of WCW and ECW 
On June 24, 1999, McMahon appeared on the Late Night with Conan O'Brien show and said he viewed Ted Turner as his rival, stating "All I'll say about Ted is he's a son-of-a-bitch, other than that, he's probably not a bad guy, but I don't like him at all".

McMahon later came out victorious against Ted Turner's World Championship Wrestling (WCW) in the television ratings in the Monday Night Wars after an initial 84 week television ratings loss to WCW and afterward acquired the fading WCW from Turner Broadcasting System on March 23, 2001, with an end to the Monday Night Wars. On April 1, 2001, Extreme Championship Wrestling (ECW) filed for bankruptcy leaving WWF as the last major wrestling promotion at that time. McMahon later acquired the assets of ECW on January 28, 2003.

In September 2020, professional wrestling promoter, WWE Hall of Famer, and former WCW president Eric Bischoff revealed that during this period of the Monday Night Wars in television ratings battles between WWE and WCW "Vince was petitioning a lot for Ted. He was trying to embarrass Ted, trying to create some anxiety with the shareholders of Turner Broadcasting. Vince was trying to create some unrest and anxiety by being very, very critical about WCW" and "whenever you'd see blood in WCW, Vince would write these letters from the king's court to Ted criticizing him, and WCW, and the health and welfare of the talent by saying it's gross, it's crap, and all this. And then he'd turn around and do the same thing a month later. None of us took any of those letters very seriously, and it was pretty obvious what Vince was trying to do. We all just chuckled about it".

In a conference call in 2021, McMahon described the "situation where "rising tides" because that was when Ted Turner was coming after us with all of Time Warner's assets as well".

Company name change and transition to the Ruthless Aggression Era  
On May 5, 2002, the World Wrestling Federation announced it was changing both its company name and the name of its wrestling promotion to World Wrestling Entertainment (WWE) after the company had lost a lawsuit initiated by the World Wildlife Fund over the WWF trademark. Shortly thereafter, the company transitioned into its Ruthless Aggression Era; McMahon officially referred to the new era as "Ruthless Aggression" on June 24, 2002. This period still featured many similar elements of its predecessor the Attitude Era, including the levels of violence, sex, and profanity, but there was less politically incorrect content, and a further emphasis on wrestling was showcased.

Transition to TV-PG ratings 

In July 2008, all WWE programs shifted to TV-PG ratings. McMahon also stated that the Attitude Era of the late 1990s and early 2000s was the result of competition from WCW and forced the company to "go for the jugular". Due to WCW's demise in 2001, McMahon says that they "don't have to" appeal to viewers in the same way and that during the "far more scripted" PG Era, WWE could "give the audience what they want in a far more sophisticated way". McMahon also stated that the move to PG cut the "excess" of the Attitude Era and "ushered in a new era of refined and compelling storytelling". McMahon also had the most say in the WWE company's creative direction. The move into the PG Era made the promotion more appealing to corporate sponsors.

Competition with AEW
In 2019, Tony Khan's All Elite Wrestling (better known as AEW) emerged as the second largest professional wrestling promotion in the market after WWE, and during a conference call on July 25, 2019, McMahon announced a new direction for WWE where he stated that it would "be a bit edgier, but still remain in the PG environment". In another conference call on July 29, 2021, McMahon stated that he doesn't consider AEW competition and that he was "not so sure what their investments are as far as their talent is concerned". WWE NXT and AEW Dynamite competed in the Wednesday Night Wars, from October 2, 2019, to April 7, 2021, which ended with AEW Dynamite emerging victorious and NXT moving to Tuesday nights. This eventually led WWE to revamp NXT with major changes to "NXT 2.0" starting from the September 14, 2021 episode.

Resignation and retirement
McMahon voluntarily stepped down as chairman and CEO of WWE on June 17, 2022, pending an internal investigation, with his daughter Stephanie McMahon being named the interim CEO and interim Chairwoman of the WWE. McMahon however continued to oversee WWE creative and content development. On July 22, 2022, Vince McMahon officially announced his retirement from WWE and named his daughter Stephanie McMahon, the company's new permanent chairwoman and Co-CEO (alongside Nick Khan). Triple H then replaced Vince McMahon as Head of WWE creative.

Return to WWE 
It was announced on January 5 by The Wall Street Journal that McMahon was planning a return to WWE as Executive Chairman, ahead of upcoming media rights negotiations in 2024 and also to explore a potential sale of the company. On January 6, WWE published a filing with the SEC, appoint Vince McMahon by himself, George Barrios and Michelle Wilson back to the WWE Board of Directors. On January 10, McMahon assumed the role of executive Chairman of the WWE.

Other business dealings 

In 1979, Vince and Linda purchased the Cape Cod Coliseum and the Cape Cod Buccaneers of the Atlantic Coast Hockey League. In addition to pro wrestling and hockey, they began selling out rock concerts (including Van Halen and Rush) in non-summer months, traditionally considered unprofitable due to lack of tourists. This venture led the McMahons to join the International Association of Arena Managers, learning the details of the arena business and networking with other managers through IAAM conferences, which Linda later called a great benefit to WWE's success.

In 1990, McMahon founded the World Bodybuilding Federation organization, which folded in 1992.

In 2000, McMahon again ventured outside the world of professional wrestling by launching the XFL, a professional American football league. The league began in February 2001, with McMahon making an appearance at the first game, but folded after one season due to low television ratings. This wasn't until January 25, 2018, when he announced its resurrection. The league filed for bankruptcy on April 13, 2020.

In February 2014, McMahon helped launch an over-the-top streaming service called the WWE Network.

In 2017, McMahon established Alpha Entertainment, a separate entity from WWE.

Professional wrestling career

World Wide/World Wrestling Federation/Entertainment/WWE

Commentator (1971–1997) 

Before the evolution of the Mr. McMahon character, McMahon appeared as a commentator on television.  His executive role was not publicized to maintain the illusion of wrestling's staged story lines, or kayfabe. While McMahon did publicly identify himself as the owner of the WWF outside of WWF programming, on television his ownership of the WWF was considered an open secret through the mid-1990s. Jack Tunney was portrayed as the president of WWF instead of McMahon.

McMahon made his commentary debut in 1971 when he replaced Ray Morgan after Morgan had a pay dispute with McMahon's father, Vincent J. McMahon, shortly before a scheduled television taping. The elder McMahon let Morgan walk instead of giving in to his demands and needed a replacement on the spot, offering it to his son. For the younger McMahon, it was also somewhat of a compromise, as it allowed him to appear on television. McMahon wanted to be a wrestler but his father did not let him, explaining that promoters did not appear on the show and should stay apart from their wrestlers.

McMahon eventually became the regular play-by-play commentator and maintained that role until November 1997, portraying himself originally as mild-mannered and diplomatic until 1984. In addition to matches, McMahon hosted other WWF shows, and introduced WWF programming to TBS on Black Saturday, upon the WWF's acquisition of Georgia Championship Wrestling and its lucrative Saturday night timeslot. McMahon sold the time slot to Jim Crockett Promotions after the move backfired on him. He eventually acquired JCP's successor company, World Championship Wrestling, from AOL Time Warner in 2001. At the 1987 Slammy Awards, McMahon performed in a musical number and sang the song "Stand Back". The campy "Stand Back" video has since resurfaced several times over the years as a running gag between McMahon and any face wrestler he is feuding with at that particular time, and was included on the 2006 McMahon DVD.

As a commentator, McMahon was a babyface "voice of the fans", a contrast to the heel color commentator, usually Jesse Ventura, Bobby Heenan or Jerry Lawler. While most of McMahon's on-screen physicality took place under his "Mr. McMahon" persona later in his career, he was involved in physical altercations on WWF television several times as a commentator or host. First, in 1977, when he and Arnold Skaaland were struck from behind by Captain Lou Albano, as part of a kayfabe "Manager Of the Year" storyline, when Albano was disgruntled over losing to Skaaland.

In 1985, Andre the Giant grabbed him by the collar during an interview on Tuesday Night Titans. Andre had become irritated at McMahon's questions regarding his feud with Big John Studd and their match at the first WrestleMania. On the September 28, 1991, episode of WWF Superstars of Wrestling, when Roddy Piper mistakenly hit him with a folding chair aimed at Ric Flair (requiring McMahon to be taken out of the arena on a stretcher), and again on the November 8, 1993, episode of Monday Night Raw, when Randy Savage hurled him to the floor in an attempt to attack Crush after McMahon attempted to restrain him.

McMahon can be seen screaming at medics and WWF personnel during the May 26, 1990, episode of WWF Superstars of Wrestling, after Hulk Hogan was attacked by Earthquake during a segment of The Brother Love Show, when Hogan was not moved out of the arena quickly enough.

Creation of the Mr. McMahon character (1996–1997) 

Throughout late 1996 and into 1997, McMahon slowly began to be referred to as the owner on WWF television while remaining as the company's lead play-by-play commentator. On the September 23, 1996 Monday Night Raw, Jim Ross delivered a worked shoot promo during which he ran down McMahon, outing him as chairman and not just a commentator for the first time in WWF storylines. This was followed up on the October 23 Raw with Stone Cold Steve Austin referring to then-WWF President Gorilla Monsoon as "just a puppet" and that it was McMahon "pulling all the strings". The March 17, 1997 WWF Raw Is War is cited by some as the beginning of the Mr. McMahon character, as after Bret Hart lost to Sycho Sid in a steel cage match for the WWF Championship, Hart engaged in an expletive-laden rant against McMahon and WWF management. This rant followed Hart shoving McMahon to the ground when he attempted to conduct a post-match interview. McMahon, himself, returned to the commentary position and nearly cursed out Hart before being calmed down by Ross and Lawler.

McMahon largely remained a commentator after the Bret Hart incident on Raw. On September 22, 1997, on the first-ever Raw to be broadcast from Madison Square Garden, Bret's brother Owen Hart was giving a speech to the fans in attendance. During his speech, Stone Cold Steve Austin entered the ring with five NYPD officers following and assaulted Hart. When it appeared Austin would fight the officers, McMahon ran into the ring to lecture him that he could not physically compete; at the time, Austin was recovering from a broken neck after Owen Hart botched a piledriver in his match against Austin at SummerSlam. After telling McMahon that he respects the fact that he and the WWF cared, Austin attacked McMahon with a Stone Cold Stunner, leaving McMahon in shock. Austin was then arrested on charges of trespassing, assault, and assaulting a police officer. This marked the beginning of the Austin-McMahon rivalry.

At Survivor Series in 1997, Bret Hart defended his WWF Championship against long-time rival Shawn Michaels in the main event. During the match, Michaels applied Hart's signature submission maneuver The Sharpshooter on Hart. Though Hart did not submit, McMahon ordered the referee to ring the bell, thus screwing Hart out of the title and making Michaels the champion and making McMahon turn heel for the first time on WWF television. This incident was subsequently dubbed the "Montreal Screwjob". Following the incident, McMahon left the commentary table for good (Jim Ross replaced McMahon as lead commentator) and the Mr. McMahon character began.

Feud with Stone Cold Steve Austin (1997–1999) 
In December 1997 on Raw Is War, the night after D-Generation X: In Your House, McMahon talked about the behavior and attitude of Stone Cold Steve Austin, such as Austin having assaulted WWF Commissioner Sgt. Slaughter and commentators such as Jim Ross and McMahon himself. Mr. McMahon demanded that Austin defend his Intercontinental Championship against The Rock in a rematch. As in the previous match, Austin used his pickup truck as a weapon against The Rock and the Nation of Domination gang. Austin decided to forfeit the title to The Rock, but instead, Austin gave The Rock a Stone Cold Stunner and knocked McMahon off the ring ropes.

During the storyline between Austin and Michaels, McMahon involved Mike Tyson, who joined D-Generation X. During the WrestleMania XIV main event during which Mike Tyson turned on Shawn Michaels and assisted Austin in becoming WWF Champion. After Austin won the title, McMahon sent Dude Love to defeat Austin at Unforgiven and Over the Edge: In Your House, where Austin retained. By employing the services of The Undertaker and Kane, McMahon set up a triple threat match for the WWF Championship at Breakdown: In Your House, in which Undertaker and Kane could only win by pinning Austin. At Breakdown, Austin lost the title after being pinned simultaneously by both Undertaker and Kane. However, no new champion was crowned.

The following night on Raw Is War, McMahon attempted to announce a new WWF Champion. He held a presentation ceremony and introduced The Undertaker and Kane. After saying that both deserved to be the WWF Champion, Austin drove a Zamboni into the arena and attacked McMahon before police officers stopped him, and arrested him. Because The Undertaker and Kane both failed to defend McMahon from Austin, McMahon did not name a new champion, but instead made a match at Judgment Day: In Your House between The Undertaker and Kane with Austin as the special referee. This prompted The Undertaker and Kane to attack Mr. McMahon, injuring his ankle because he gave them the finger behind their backs.

At Judgement Day, there was still no champion crowned as Austin declared himself the winner after counting a double pinfall three count for both men. McMahon ordered the WWF Championship to be defended in a 14-man tournament named Deadly Games at Survivor Series in 1998. McMahon made sure that Mankind reached the finals because Mankind had visited McMahon in the hospital after McMahon was sent to the hospital by The Undertaker and Kane. He also awarded Mankind the WWF Hardcore Championship due to his status as a hardcore wrestling legend. Originally, McMahon was acting as he if he was helping out Mankind during the match.

At one point, The Rock turned his attention to McMahon. McMahon turned on Mankind after a screwjob, as The Rock had caught Mankind in the Sharpshooter. Mankind had not submitted but McMahon ordered the referee to ring the bell, thus giving The Rock the WWF Championship. This was a homage to the "Montreal Screwjob" that occurred one year earlier. McMahon referred to The Rock as the "Corporate Champion" thus forming the corporation with his son Shane and The Rock.

At Rock Bottom: In Your House, Mankind defeated The Rock to win the WWF Championship after The Rock passed out to the Mandible Claw. McMahon, screwed Mankind once again by reversing the decision and returning the belt to his chosen champion, The Rock. McMahon participated in a "Corporate Rumble" on the January 11, 1999 Raw as an unscheduled participant, but was eliminated by Chyna.

McMahon restarted a long-running feud with Stone Cold Steve Austin when, in December 1998, he made Austin face the Undertaker in a Buried Alive match with the Royal Rumble qualification on the line. Austin defeated the Undertaker with help from Kane. McMahon had put up $100,000 to anyone who could eliminate Austin from the Royal Rumble match. At Royal Rumble, thanks to help from the corporation's attack on Austin in the women's bathroom during the match. Austin and McMahon went under the ropes, not over them as the Royal Rumble rules require for elimination to occur, along with the 'Shawn Michaels Rule', in which both feet must touch the floor after going over the top rope.

The Rock distracted Austin, and McMahon lifted Austin over the top rope from behind, winning the match and earning a title shot at WrestleMania XV against the WWF Champion The Rock. He turned down his spot, and WWF Commissioner Shawn Michaels awarded it to Austin, which infuriated McMahon. Austin decided to put his title shot on the line against McMahon so he could get a chance to fight Vince at In Your House: St. Valentine's Day Massacre in a steel cage match. During the match, Big Show — a future member of the Corporation — interrupted, making his WWF debut. He threw Austin through the side of the cage thus giving him the victory.

The Corporation started a feud with The Undertaker's new faction the "Ministry of Darkness", which led to a storyline introducing McMahon's daughter Stephanie. Stephanie played an "innocent sweet girl" who was kidnapped by The Ministry twice. The first time she was kidnapped, she was found by Ken Shamrock on behalf of McMahon in a basement of the stadium. The second time she was kidnapped, The Undertaker attempted to marry her whilst she was forcefully tied to the Ministry's crucifix, but she was saved by Steve Austin. This angle saw a brief friendship develop between McMahon and Austin, cooling their long-running feud.

McMahon became a member of the short-lived stable The Union, during May 1999. McMahon's son Shane merged the corporation with Undertaker's Ministry of Darkness to form the Corporate Ministry. On the June 7 episode of Raw Is War, McMahon was revealed as the "Higher Power" behind the Corporate Ministry. This not only reignited McMahon's feud with WWF Champion Austin but also caused a kayfabe disgusted Linda and Stephanie McMahon to give their 50% share of the WWF to Austin.

At King of the Ring, Vince and Shane defeated Austin in a handicap ladder match to regain control of the WWF. While CEO, Austin had scheduled a WWF Championship match, to be shown on Raw Is War after King Of The Ring. During the match, Austin defeated the Undertaker once again to become the WWF Champion. At Fully Loaded, Austin was again scheduled for a first blood match against The Undertaker. If Austin lost, he would be banned from wrestling for the WWF Championship again; if he won, Vince McMahon would be banned from appearing on WWF television. Austin defeated The Undertaker, and McMahon was banned from WWF television.

McMahon returned as a face in the fall of 1999 and won the WWF Championship in a match against Triple H, thanks to outside interference from Austin on the September 16 SmackDown!. He had decided to vacate the title during the following Monday's Raw Is War because he was not allowed on WWF television because of the stipulations of the Fully Loaded contract he signed. However, Stone Cold Steve Austin reinstated him in return for a WWF title shot. Over the next few months, McMahon and Triple H feuded, with the linchpin of the feud being Triple H's storyline marriage to Stephanie McMahon. The feud culminated at Armageddon in 1999; McMahon faced Triple H in a No Holds Barred match which McMahon lost. Afterward, Stephanie turned on him, revealing her true colors. McMahon, along with his son Shane, then disappeared from WWF television, unable to accept the union between Triple H and Stephanie. This left Triple H and Stephanie in complete control of the WWF.

McMahon-Helmsley era (2000–2001) 
McMahon returned to WWF television on the March 13, 2000 Raw Is War helping The Rock win his WWF title shot back from the Big Show. He also attacked Shane McMahon and Triple H. Two weeks later, McMahon and The Rock defeated Shane McMahon and The Big Show in a tag team match with help from special guest referee Mankind. At WrestleMania 2000, Triple H defended the WWF Championship in a Fatal Four-Way Elimination match in which each competitor had a McMahon in his corner. Triple H had his wife Stephanie McMahon who was also the WWF Women's Champion in his corner, The Rock had Vince McMahon in his corner, Mick Foley had Linda McMahon in his corner, and Big Show had Shane in his corner. After Big Show and Foley were eliminated, Triple H and The Rock were left. Although Vince was in The Rock's corner, he turned on The Rock after hitting him with a chair, turning heel for the first time since his feud with Stone Cold Steve Austin, which helped Triple H win the match and retain his title. This began the McMahon-Helmsley Era.

At King of the Ring, McMahon, Shane, and WWF Champion Triple H took on The Brothers of Destruction (The Undertaker and Kane) and The Rock in a six-man tag team match for the WWF Championship. This match stipulated that whoever made the scoring pinfall would become the WWF Champion. McMahon was pinned by The Rock. McMahon was then absent from WWF television until late 2000. On the December 4 episode of Raw Is War, McMahon questioned the motives of WWF Commissioner Mick Foley and expressed concern of the well-being of the six superstars competing in the Hell in a Cell match at Armageddon. On the December 18 episode of Raw Is War, McMahon faced Kurt Angle in a non-title match which was fought to no contest when Mick Foley interfered and attacked both men. After the match, both men beat Foley and McMahon fired him.

McMahon then began a public extramarital affair with Trish Stratus, much to the disgust of his daughter, Stephanie. However, on the February 26 episode of Raw, McMahon and Stephanie humiliated Trish by dumping sewage on her, with McMahon adding that Stephanie will always be "daddy's little girl" and Trish was only "daddy's little toy". McMahon and Stephanie then aligned together against Shane, who'd returned and had enough of Vince's actions in recent months.

At WrestleMania X-Seven, McMahon lost to Shane after Linda—who had been emotionally abused to the point of a nervous breakdown; the breakdown was caused after Vince demanded a divorce on the December 7 episode of SmackDown!; the breakdown left her helpless as she was deemed unable to continue being CEO of the WWF at the time, giving Vince 100% authority; finally, she was heavily sedated, in the storyline—hit Vince with a low blow.

On the same night, McMahon allied with Stone Cold Steve Austin, helping him defeat The Rock to gain another WWF Championship. The two, along with Triple H, allied. Austin and Triple H put The Rock out of action with a brutal assault and suspension; this was done so The Rock could film The Scorpion King. Austin and Triple H held all three major WWF titles at the same time. The alliance was short-lived, due to an injury to Triple H and a business venture by McMahon.

The Invasion and brand extension (2001–2005) 

McMahon purchased long-time rival promotion World Championship Wrestling (WCW) in March 2001 from AOL Time Warner and signed many wrestlers from the organization. This marked the beginning of the Invasion storyline, in which the former WCW wrestlers regularly fought matches against the WWF wrestlers. On the July 9, 2001, episode of Raw Is War, some extremists as well as several former ECW wrestlers on the WWF roster, joined with the WCW wrestlers to form The Alliance. Stone Cold Steve Austin joined the Alliance, along with Shane and Stephanie McMahon. Vince McMahon led Team WWF thus turning face. At Survivor Series, Team WWF defeated Team Alliance in a Survivor Series elimination match to pick up the victory and end the Invasion storyline.

Following the collapse of The Alliance, McMahon created the "Vince McMahon Kiss My Ass Club", also known as the "Mr. McMahon Kiss My Ass Club", which consisted of various WWE individuals being ordered to kiss his buttocks in the middle of the ring, usually with the threat of suspension or firing if they refused reverting to a heel. The club was originally proclaimed closed by The Rock after McMahon was forced to kiss Rikishi's buttocks on an episode of SmackDown!.

In November 2001, Ric Flair returned to WWF after an eight-year hiatus declaring himself the co-owner of the WWF, which infuriated McMahon. The two faced each other in January 2002, at Royal Rumble, in a Street Fight which Flair won. Due to their status as co-owners, McMahon became the owner of SmackDown! while Flair became the owner of Raw. However, on the June 10 Raw, McMahon defeated Flair to end the rivalry and become the sole owner of WWE.
 
On the February 13, 2003 SmackDown!, McMahon tried to derail the return of Hulk Hogan after a five-month hiatus but was knocked out by Hogan and received a running leg drop. At No Way Out, McMahon interfered in Hogan's match with The Rock. Hogan hit The Rock with a running leg drop and went for the pin, but the lights went out. When the lights came back on, McMahon came to the ringside to distract Hogan. Sylvain Grenier, the referee, gave The Rock a chair, which he then hit Hogan with. He ended the match with a Rock Bottom to defeat Hogan.

This led to McMahon facing Hogan in a match at WrestleMania XIX, which McMahon lost in a Street Fight. McMahon then banned Hogan from the ring but Hogan returned under the gimmick of "Mr. America". McMahon tried to prove that Mr. America was Hogan under a mask but failed at these attempts. Hogan later quit WWE and at which point McMahon claimed that he had discovered Mr. America was Hulk Hogan and "fired" him.
 
McMahon asked his daughter Stephanie to resign as SmackDown! General Manager on the October 2 SmackDown!. Stephanie, however, refused to resign and this set up an "I Quit" match between the two. At No Mercy, McMahon defeated Stephanie in an "I Quit" match when Linda threw in the towel. Later that night, he helped Brock Lesnar retain the WWE Championship against The Undertaker in a Biker Chain match. This started a rivalry between McMahon and Undertaker. At Survivor Series, McMahon defeated Undertaker in a Buried Alive match with help from Kane.

Feuds with D-Generation X, Donald Trump, and Bobby Lashley (2005–2007) 
He began a feud with Eric Bischoff in late 2005, when he decided that Bischoff was not doing a good job as General Manager of Raw turning face again. He started "The Trial of Eric Bischoff" where McMahon served as the judge. Bischoff ended up losing the trial; McMahon "fired" him, and put him in a garbage truck before it drove away. Bischoff stayed gone for months. Almost a year later on Raw in late 2006, Bischoff was brought out by McMahon's executive assistant Jonathan Coachman so that he could announce the completion of his book Controversy Creates Cash. Bischoff began blasting remarks at McMahon, saying that he was fired "unceremoniously" as the Raw General Manager, that there would be no McMahon if not for Bischoff's over-the-top rebellious ideas, and that D-Generation X was nothing but a rip off of the New World Order.

On the December 26, 2005 Raw, McMahon personally reviewed Bret Hart's DVD. Shawn Michaels came out and he also started talking about Hart. McMahon replied, "I screwed Bret Hart. Shawn, don't make me screw you". At the 2006 Royal Rumble, when Michaels was among the final six remaining participants after eliminating Shelton Benjamin, McMahon's entrance theme music distracted Michaels, allowing Shane McMahon to eliminate him. On the February 27 Raw, Michaels was knocked unconscious by Shane. When Michaels' former Rockers tag team partner Marty Jannetty came to the rescue of Michaels, he was forced to join McMahon's "Kiss My Ass Club".

On Saturday Night's Main Event XXXII, Michaels faced Shane in a Street Fight. McMahon screwed Michaels while Shane had Michaels in the Sharpshooter. Michaels had not submitted, but McMahon ordered the referee to ring the bell, giving Shane the victory (another Montreal Screwjob reference). At WrestleMania 22, Vince McMahon faced Michaels in a No Holds Barred match. Despite interference from the Spirit Squad and Shane, McMahon was unable to beat Michaels. At Backlash, Vince McMahon and his son Shane defeated Michaels and "God" (characterized by a spotlight) in a No Holds Barred match.

On the May 15 Raw, Triple H hit Shane with a sledgehammer meant for Michaels. The next week on Raw, Triple H had another chance to hit Michaels with the object but he instead whacked the Spirit Squad. For a few weeks, McMahon ignored Michaels and began a rivalry with Triple H by forcing him to join "Kiss My Ass Club" (Triple H hit McMahon with a Pedigree instead of joining the club) and pitting him in a gauntlet handicap match against the Spirit Squad. Michaels, however, saved Triple H and the two reformed D-Generation X (DX). This led to a feud between the McMahons and DX, throughout the following summer.

He also with the Spirit Squad teaming with Shane lost to Eugene by disqualification on July 10. At SummerSlam in 2006, the McMahons lost to DX in a tag team match despite interference by Umaga, Big Show, Finlay, Mr. Kennedy, and William Regal. The McMahons also allied themselves with the ECW World Champion Big Show. At Unforgiven, the McMahons teamed up with The Big Show in a Hell in a Cell match to take on DX. Despite their 3-on-2 advantage, the McMahons lost again to DX thus ending the rivalry.

In January 2007, McMahon started a pretend feud with Donald Trump, which was featured on major media outlets. Originally Trump wanted to fight McMahon himself but they came to a deal: both men would pick a representative to wrestle at WrestleMania 23 in a Hair vs. Hair match. The man whose wrestler lost would have his head shaved bald. After the contract signing on Raw, Trump pushed McMahon over the table in the ring onto his head after McMahon provoked Trump with several finger pokes to the shoulders. Later at a press conference, McMahon, during a photo opportunity, offered to shake hands with Trump but retracted his hand as Trump put out his.

McMahon went on to fiddle with Trump's tie and flick Trump's nose. This angered Trump as he then slapped McMahon across the face. McMahon was then restrained from retaliating by Trump's bodyguards and Bobby Lashley, Trump's representative. At WrestleMania 23, McMahon's representative (Umaga) lost the match. As a result, McMahon's hair was shaved bald by Trump and Lashley with the help of Steve Austin, who was the special guest referee of the "Battle of the Billionaires" match.

McMahon then began a rivalry with Lashley over his ECW World Championship. At Backlash, McMahon pinned Lashley in a 3-on-1 handicap match teaming up with his son Shane and Umaga to win the ECW World Championship. At Judgment Day, McMahon defended his ECW World Championship against Lashley again in a 3-on-1 handicap match. Lashley won the match as he pinned Shane after a Dominator but McMahon said that he was still the champion because Lashley could only be champion if he could beat him. McMahon finally lost the ECW World Championship to Lashley at One Night Stand in a Street Fight despite interference by Shane and Umaga.

Faked death, illegitimate son, and Million Dollar Mania (2007–2008) 

On June 11, 2007, WWE aired a segment at the end of Raw that featured McMahon entering a limousine moments before it exploded. The show went off-air shortly after, and WWE.com reported the angle within minutes as though it were a legitimate occurrence, proclaiming that McMahon was "presumed dead". Although this was the fate of the fictional "Mr. McMahon" character, no harm came to the actual person; the "presumed death" of McMahon was part of a storyline. WWE later acknowledged to CNBC that he was not truly dead.

The June 25 Raw was scheduled to be a three-hour memorial to "Mr. McMahon". However, due to the actual death of Chris Benoit, the show opened with McMahon standing in an empty arena, acknowledging that his reported death was only of his character as part of a storyline. This was followed by a tribute to Benoit that filled the three-hour timeslot. McMahon appeared the next night on ECW on Sci Fi in which after acknowledging that a tribute to Benoit had aired the previous night, he announced that there would be no further mention of Benoit due to the circumstances becoming apparent and that the ECW show would be dedicated to those that had been affected by the Benoit murders.

On August, the Mr McMahon character returned and started a storyline where he had an illegitimate long-lost child, who was revealed as Hornswoggle. In February 2008, after months of "tough love" antics towards Hornswoggle, John "Bradshaw" Layfield revealed that Hornswoggle was not McMahon's son and that he was actually Finlay's son. It turned out that the scam was thought up by Shane, Stephanie and Linda McMahon, along with Finlay.

On the June 2 Raw, McMahon announced that starting the next week, he would give away US$1 million live on Raw. Fans could register online, and each week randomly selected fans would receive a part of the $1 million. McMahon's Million Dollar Mania lasted just three weeks and was suspended after the 3-hour Draft episode of Raw on June 23. After giving away $500,000, explosions tore apart the Raw stage, which fell and collapsed on top of McMahon. On June 30, Shane addressed the WWE audience before Raw, informing the fans that his family had chosen to keep his father's condition private. He also urged the WWE roster to stand together during what he described as a "turbulent time". The McMahons made several requests to the wrestlers for solidarity, before finally appointing Mike Adamle as the new general manager of Raw to restore order to the brand.

Feud with The Legacy and Bret Hart (2009–2010) 
On the January 5, 2009 Raw, Chris Jericho told Stephanie McMahon that McMahon would be returning to Raw soon. The following week, Jericho was (kayfabe) fired from WWE by Stephanie. On the January 19 Raw, McMahon returned, as a face, and supported his daughter's decision on Jericho, but Stephanie rehired him. Randy Orton then came out and assaulted McMahon after harassing Stephanie. McMahon returned on the March 30 Raw with his son, Shane, and son-in-law Triple H to confront Orton.

The night after WrestleMania 25, McMahon appeared on Raw to announce Orton would not receive another championship opportunity at Backlash, but compete in a six-man tag team match with his Legacy stablemates against Triple H, Shane McMahon and himself. Raw General Manager Vickie Guerrero made the match for the WWE Championship. Orton then challenged McMahon to a match that night, in which Legacy assaulted him, and Orton also hitting him with the RKO.

After being assisted by Triple H, Shane and a returning Batista, McMahon announced Batista would replace him in the match at Backlash. On the June 15 Raw, McMahon announced that he had sold the Raw brand to businessman Donald Trump. The next week, during the Trump is Raw show, McMahon bought the brand back from Trump. On the June 29 Raw, McMahon announced that every week, a celebrity guest host would control Raw for the night. He soon appeared on SmackDown, putting Theodore Long on probation for his actions.

On August 24 Raw, McMahon had a birthday bash which was interrupted by The Legacy, and competed in a six-man tag team match with his long-time rival team D-X, in which they won after the interference of John Cena. He continued to appear on SmackDown, making occasional matches and reminding Long that he was still on probation. On the November 16 Raw, McMahon was called out by guest host Roddy Piper, who wanted a match with McMahon that night in Madison Square Garden. McMahon declined and announced his retirement from in-ring competition.

On the January 4, 2010 Raw, McMahon, once again a heel, confronted special guest host Bret "The Hitman" Hart for the (televised) first time since the Montreal Screwjob at Survivor Series 1997, to bury the hatchet from the above-mentioned Montreal Screwjob. The two appeared to finally bury the hatchet, but after shaking hands, Vince kicked Hart in the groin and left the arena to a loud chorus of boos and the crowd chanting "You screwed Bret! You screwed Bret!".

A match was then booked between the two at WrestleMania XXVI, which saw Hart defeat McMahon in a No Holds Barred Lumberjack match. On the May 31 Raw, McMahon returned to congratulate Hart on becoming the new Raw General Manager. On the June 22 Raw, McMahon fired Hart for not dealing with NXT season one rookies, known as The Nexus. That same night, he announced the new General Manager would be anonymous and make decisions via emails, which would be read by Michael Cole.

The General Manager's first decision was McMahon to be the guest referee for a WWE Championship match that night between John Cena and Sheamus. The match was interrupted by The Nexus who then attacked McMahon. McMahon appeared in a segment on the November 1 Raw, in a coma from the attack by The Nexus. He woke up and his doctor (Freddie Prinze Jr.) explained what had happened since he had been out. The scene transitioned to Stephanie McMahon waking up, revealing it was all a dream.

Storyline with John Laurinaitis and CM Punk (2011–2012) 
In early 2011, McMahon once again stepped away from WWE storylines to focus on both his corporate and backstage duties.

On the June 27 episode of Raw, CM Punk made a scathing on-air speech criticizing WWE and McMahon about the way WWE was run. McMahon suspended Punk but reinstated him at the behest of Punk's Money in the Bank opponent, WWE Champion John Cena. At Money in the Bank, McMahon and Vice President of Talent Relations John Laurinaitis interfered on Cena's behalf but Punk was ultimately successful and walked out of the company with the championship. On the following Raw, Triple H returned and, on behalf of WWE's board of directors, fired McMahon from his position of running Raw and SmackDown, though leaving him chairman of the board.

Triple H then announced he had been designated Chief Operating Officer of WWE. McMahon returned on the October 10 Raw, firing Triple H from running Raw, stating the board of directors had called Triple H a financial catastrophe, and that WWE employees had voted no confidence in him the previous week. He subsequently appointed Laurinaitis as the interim general manager of Raw.

On June 11, 2012, McMahon returned to give a job evaluation to John Laurinaitis. After a conflict with Cena and Big Show that saw McMahon accidentally knocked out by Big Show, McMahon declared that if Big Show lost his match at No Way Out, Laurinaitis would be fired. Cena defeated Big Show in a steel cage match, and McMahon fired Laurinaitis. McMahon announced AJ Lee as Raw's new general manager at Raw 1000 and made Booker T SmackDown's new general manager on August 3 episode of SmackDown. After CM Punk interrupted him on the October 8 episode of Raw, he challenged Punk to a match, threatening to fire him if he declined. The match did not officially start, but McMahon held his own in a brawl with Punk until Punk attempted the GTS. Ryback and Cena interfered and McMahon ultimately booked Punk in a match with Ryback at Hell in a Cell.

The Authority (2013–2017) 
During the buildup for the 2013 Royal Rumble, McMahon told CM Punk that if The Shield interfered in his match with The Rock, Punk would forfeit the WWE Championship. During the match, the lights went out and The Rock was attacked by what appeared to be The Shield, leading to The Rock's loss. McMahon came out and restarted the match at The Rock's request and The Rock won the championship from Punk. The next night on Raw, while conducting a performance review on Paul Heyman, he was assaulted by the returning Brock Lesnar, who attacked him with the F-5. According to WWE.com, McMahon broke his pelvis and required surgery.

Vince sought revenge on Heyman and faced him in a street fight on the February 25 episode of Raw, but Lesnar again interfered, only for Triple H to interfere as well, setting up a rematch between Lesnar and Triple H at WrestleMania 29. From June 2013, members of the McMahon family began to dispute various elements of the control of WWE, such as the fates of Daniel Bryan, and of Raw and SmackDown general managers Brad Maddox and Vickie Guerrero. After Triple H and Stephanie created The Authority, McMahon celebrated Randy Orton's victory at TLC with them, but stepped aside from his on-screen authority role in early 2014 to evaluate Triple H and Stephanie's control of the company.

McMahon returned on the November 3, 2014, episode of Raw, making a stipulation that if Team Cena had defeated Team Authority at Survivor Series, The Authority would be removed from power. Team Cena won the match, but McMahon gave John Cena the option to reinstate The Authority. McMahon returned on the December 14, 2015, episode of Raw, aligning himself with The Authority, by confronting Roman Reigns over his attack on Triple H at the TLC pay-per-view. McMahon granted Reigns a rematch for the WWE World Heavyweight Championship against Sheamus, with the stipulation that if he failed to win the championship he would be fired. During the match, McMahon interfered on Sheamus' behalf but was attacked by Reigns, who then pinned Sheamus to win the WWE World Heavyweight Championship.

On the December 28 episode of Raw, McMahon was arrested for assaulting an NYPD officer and resisting arrest after a confrontation with Roman Reigns. McMahon made himself special guest referee in Reigns' rematch against Sheamus on the January 4, 2016, episode of Raw, where Reigns won after McMahon was knocked out and another referee made the decision. With his plan foiled, McMahon retaliated by announcing after the match that Reigns would defend his title at the Royal Rumble against 29 other men in the Royal Rumble match, which was won by Triple H.

On the February 22, episode of Raw, McMahon presented the first-ever "Vincent J. McMahon Legacy of Excellence" Award to Stephanie before being interrupted Shane McMahon, who returned to WWE for the first time in over six years, confronting his father and sister, and claiming that he wanted control of Raw. This led to Vince book Shane against The Undertaker at WrestleMania 32 in a Hell in a Cell match with the stipulation that if Shane won, he would have full control of Raw and The Undertaker would be banned from competing in any future WrestleMania. On the April 4 episode of Raw, McMahon gloated about Shane's loss at WrestleMania the previous night, before Shane came out, accepted his defeat and said goodbye, leading McMahon to allow Shane to run that nights show, after feeling upstaged by his son. After Shane ran Raw for the rest of April, at Payback, McMahon announced Shane and Stephanie had joint control.

On the April 3, 2017, episode of Raw, McMahon returned to announce Kurt Angle as the new Raw General Manager and the upcoming Superstar Shake-up.

On September 5, it was announced that McMahon would make an appearance on the September 12 episode of SmackDown Live. At the end of that night as a face, McMahon confronted Kevin Owens, who was unhappy about Vince's son Shane attacking him the week before, which resulted in Shane being suspended. McMahon was furious about the heinous words regarding his family, and how Owens was not respectful, and how he planned to prosecute everybody who wronged him. McMahon warned him that his lawsuit would result in him being fired, but McMahon has the cash to deal with that empty threat.

This prompted Owens to say Shane put his hands on him, but McMahon said he suspended Shane for not finishing off Owens. Shane was then reinstated to face Owens at the Hell in a Cell pay-per-view. Owens then attacked McMahon, leaving him lying in the ring. Even with several referees present, Owens continued to attack McMahon, and splashed down on him from atop one of the ring posts, resulting in McMahon being (kayfabe) injured. Stephanie McMahon also returned to help her father, as he was attended to by WWE officials.

Sporadic appearances and retirement (2018–2022) 
On January 22, 2018, McMahon returned on Raw 25 Years to address the WWE Universe, only to later turn on them by calling them "cheap" turning heel once again. He was later confronted, and stunnered, by Stone Cold Steve Austin. On March 12, McMahon made an appearance in a backstage segment with Roman Reigns, announcing that Reigns would be suspended for his recent actions. On SmackDown 1000 McMahon returned as face once again after dancing on TruthTV.

McMahon returned once again to WWE television on the December 17, 2018, episode of Monday Night Raw, accompanied by his son Shane, daughter Stephanie McMahon, and his son-in-law Triple H, promising to shake things up as they admitted they weren't performing as well as they should have. McMahon announced that the four of them would now run both Monday Night Raw and SmackDown Live collectively. In early 2019, McMahon entered in the feud between Daniel Bryan and Kofi Kingston, not letting that latter receive a WWE championship match at WrestleMania.

McMahon returned to WWE television on the April 24, 2020, episode of Friday Night SmackDown, in celebration of Triple H's 25th anniversary in WWE. He also appeared at Survivor Series (2020) introducing The Undertaker to the ring during his retirement celebrations, and in night 1 of WrestleMania 37 on April 10, 2021, to welcome the fans back in person at the Raymond James Stadium after a year of halting live events due to the COVID-19 pandemic.

On the November 22, 2021, episode of Raw, McMahon held an investigation to find out who stole Cleopatra's Egg, a gift given to him by The Rock the previous night at Survivor Series. Later that night, Austin Theory revealed that he had stolen the Egg. McMahon rewarded Theory a WWE Championship match against Big E in the main event for "showing intestinal fortitude", and over the next several months, McMahon gave career advice to Theory. At WrestleMania 38, after Pat McAfee defeated Austin Theory, McMahon was challenged to an impromptu match by McAfee, which McMahon accepted, and in which McMahon defeated McAfee. This was McMahon's first match in 12 years, as well as McMahon's first win at WrestleMania. Following the match, Stone Cold Steve Austin interrupted McMahon and Theory celebrating the win and gave them both Stone Cold Stunners.

United States Wrestling Association (1993) 
While the Mr. McMahon character marked the first time that McMahon had been portrayed as a villain in WWF, in 1993, McMahon was engaged in a feud with Jerry Lawler as part of a cross-promotion between the WWF and the United States Wrestling Association (USWA). As part of the angle, McMahon sent various WWF wrestlers to Memphis to dethrone Lawler as the "king of professional wrestling". This angle marked the first time that McMahon physically interjected himself into a match, as he occasionally tripped and punched at Lawler while seated ringside. During the angle, McMahon was not acknowledged as the owner of the WWF.

the feud was not acknowledged on WWF television, as the two continued to provide commentary together (along with Randy Savage) for the television show Superstars. The feud also helped build toward Lawler's match with Bret Hart at SummerSlam. The peak of the angle came with Tatanka defeating Lawler to win the USWA Championship with McMahon gloating at Lawler while wearing the championship belt. This storyline came to an abrupt end when Lawler was accused of raping a young girl in Memphis, and he was dropped from the WWF. He returned shortly afterward, as the girl later stated that the rape accusations were lies.

Professional wrestling style and persona 
McMahon's on-screen persona is known for his throaty exclamation of "You're fired!", and his "power walk", an exaggerated strut toward the ring, swinging his arms and bobbing his head from side to side in a cocky manner. According to Jim Cornette, the power walk was inspired by one of McMahon's favorite wrestlers as a child, Dr. Jerry Graham. The Fabulous Moolah claims in her autobiography that "Nature Boy" Buddy Rogers was the inspiration for the walk. According to composer Jim Johnston, the idea behind his theme song, "No Chance in Hell", was "He's got the power, the money, and ..., he was pretty much the only game in town. ... Rather than a song about one man, I wanted it to be about 'The Man.'"

Legacy 

Vince McMahon is often described as the most influential person in professional wrestling history and for having had a large impact on television and American culture. ESPN reporter Shaun Assael writes: "As a TV pioneer, he went from selling costumed super-heroes like Hulk Hogan to dark anti-heroes like Steve Austin. He helped give birth to reality television by making himself a central character, and he launched The Rock into a movie career. No one in television can match his longevity. Few have his instincts for what sells."

Scott Hammond of VultureHound magazine praised the legacy of McMahon's successes, from Hulkamania and WrestleMania being essential to the 1980s wrestling boom, to defeating WCW in the Monday Night Wars. His daughter, Stephanie McMahon, credits him for creating the term "sports entertainment" and publicly acknowledging wrestling's predetermined nature, while Thom Loverro of The Washington Times ascribes McMahon with shaping reality television and American politics with sports entertainment. Television executive Dick Ebersol considers McMahon to be the best partner he has worked with and believes he has impacted American culture.

McMahon's close friend and former on-screen rival, ex-U.S. president Donald Trump, praised McMahon, stating: "People love this stuff, and it's all because of Vince McMahon and his vision." Promoter and former WWF manager Jim Cornette called McMahon "the most successful promoter ever", stating: "If you could cross a genius with P. T. Barnum and [Trump], you would get the love child that would be Vince McMahon." Tony Khan, the promoter of rival promotion All Elite Wrestling (AEW), considers McMahon to be one of his idols, while former WCW President Eric Bischoff describes him as "brilliant".

Arn Anderson calls McMahon a "marketing genius" for attracting women and children to the product, but says it came at the expense of "the bell-to-bell action", which is the reason most wrestlers got into the business. Cornette stated that older wrestlers dislike him for "breaking the code" by acknowledging that wrestling is predetermined, that fans who only watched during the Attitude Era will remember him well and that he will be criticized by modern fans for being "an old man ... [that presides] over a bland, boring product". Although Hammond praised McMahon for his successes from the 1980s through the 2000s, he wrote that, "from seemingly listening to the fans and pushing the talent that got the biggest reaction to just listening to himself, McMahon has therefore taken many wrong turns in recent years".

Jon Moxley, who wrestled for WWE as Dean Ambrose, left WWE in favor of then-upstart AEW because of WWE's creative process in 2019 and singled out McMahon for being the problem. WWE recorded record annual profits into the 2020s, which MarketWatch reported had come at the cost of "A diminished roster and less-than-inspiring story lines"; by 2022, Bryan Alvarez of Wrestling Observer Newsletter commented that wrestling had declined in popularity due to the dwindling viewership since McMahon purchased WCW. An article in Variety also blamed McMahon for the continuous decrease in ratings over the years and urged investors to hold him accountable. Other criticisms of McMahon include Arn Anderson and Bret Hart commenting that McMahon has minimized tag team wrestling, while Assael also writes that "Steroids will always be a part of [his] legacy" because of his legal trial and the controversies that arose in the aftermath of Chris Benoit's death.

The Undertaker has praised McMahon, referring to Vince as "a caring human being, not the monster that people think that he is, I've never taken for granted the special opportunity he gave me, If Vince feels like there's still something there, I have a place on the roster, then I had no problem doing it". Jim Ross has stated that "People misunderstand Mr. McMahon and Vince McMahon. It's a lot easier to bitch at somebody and knock them as Mr. McMahon than understand the human being that is Vince McMahon."

Drew McIntyre, Kurt Angle, Dwayne Johnson and John Cena praise him as being a father figure to them. Stone Cold Steve Austin says that he loves and respects McMahon, despite a previous acrimonious relationship at times. Chris Jericho has praised McMahon stating "he's set in his ways of doing things and they're very successful", while Seth Rollins praised his ideas and longevity and Roman Reigns described him as a "provider and a protector" and said that he and his coworkers are grateful for him.

Other media 
In February 2001, Playboy published an interview with McMahon and his son Shane. In March 2006, at age 60, McMahon was featured on the cover of Muscle & Fitness magazine. In August 2006, McMahon, a two-disc DVD set showcasing McMahon's career was released. In March 2015, at age 69, McMahon once again appeared on the cover of Muscle & Fitness magazine.

Personal life

Family 

McMahon married Linda Edwards on August 26, 1966, in New Bern, North Carolina. The two met in church when she was 13 and he was 16; at that time, he was known as Vince Lupton, using his stepfather's surname. They were introduced by his mother. Multiple reports in 2022 suggested that McMahon and Edwards had been separated for some time.

McMahon and Edwards have two children together: Shane, who left WWE in 2010 and returned in 2016, and Stephanie, who continued to be active in a backstage role and onscreen from the 1990s until resigning in 2023. McMahon and Edwards have six grandchildren; Shane and his wife Marissa Mazzola have three sons named Declan, Kenyon, and Rogan, while Stephanie and her husband Paul "Triple H" Levesque have three daughters named Aurora, Murphy, and Vaughn.

Wealth 
As of 2006, McMahon has a $12 million penthouse in Manhattan, New York; a $40 million mansion in Greenwich, Connecticut; a $20 million vacation home; and a 47-foot sports yacht named Sexy Bitch. His wealth has been noted at $1.1 billion, backing up WWE's claim he was a billionaire for 2001, although he was reported to have since dropped off the list between 2002 and 2013. In 2014, McMahon had an estimated net worth of $1.2 billion. On May 16, 2014, McMahon's worth dropped to an estimated $750 million after his WWE stock fell $350 million due to a price drop following disappointing business outcomes. In 2015, McMahon returned to the list with an estimated worth of $1.2 billion. In 2018, his net worth reached $3.6 billion.

Charity work
McMahon and Edwards donated over $8 million in 2008, giving grants to the Fishburne Military School, Sacred Heart University, and East Carolina University. Nonprofit Quarterly noted the majority of the McMahons' donations were towards capital expenditures. In 2006, they paid $2.5 million for construction of a tennis facility in Ebensburg, Pennsylvania. The McMahons have supported the Special Olympics since 1986, first developing an interest through their friendship with NBC producer Dick Ebersol and Susan Saint James, who encouraged them to participate.

Politics
McMahon and Edwards have donated to various Republican Party causes, including $1 million in 2014 to federal candidates and political action committees, such as Karl Rove's American Crossroads and the research and tracking group America Rising. The McMahons have donated $5 million to Donald Trump's former charity, the Donald J. Trump Foundation.

Controversies

Steroid supplier trial 

In November 1993, McMahon was indicted in federal court after a steroid controversy engulfed the promotion and thus temporarily ceded control of the WWF to his wife Linda. The case went to trial in 1994, where McMahon was accused of distributing steroids to his wrestlers. One prosecution witness was Kevin Wacholz, who had wrestled for the company in 1992 as "Nailz" and who had been fired after a violent confrontation with McMahon. Wacholz testified that McMahon had ordered him to use steroids, but his credibility was called into question during his testimony as he made it clear he "hated" McMahon. In July 1994, the jury acquitted McMahon of the charges.

On July 6, 2021, production was announced on a new scripted television series called The United States of America vs. Vince McMahon centered around the case. The series is produced by a partnership of WWE Studios and Blumhouse Television and executive produced by McMahon and Kevin Dunn, WWE Executive Producer and Chief of Global Television Distribution.

Sexual misconduct allegations 
On April 3, 1992, Rita Chatterton, a former referee noted for her stint as Rita Marie in the WWF in the 1980s and for being the first female referee in the WWF (possibly in professional wrestling history), made an appearance on Geraldo Rivera's show Now It Can Be Told. She claimed that on July 16, 1986, McMahon tried to force her to perform oral sex on him in his limousine; when she refused, he raped her. Former wrestler Leonard Inzitari corroborated Chatterton's allegation in a 2022 interview in New York Magazine.

McMahon was accused of sexual harassment by a worker at a tanning bar in Boca Raton, Florida on February 1, 2006. At first, the charge appeared to be discredited because McMahon was in Miami for the 2006 Royal Rumble at the time. It was soon clarified that the alleged incident was reported to police on the day of the Rumble, but actually took place the day before. On March 25, it was reported that no charges would be filed against McMahon as a result of the investigation.

The WWE board began investigating a $3 million hush-money settlement that McMahon paid over an alleged affair with a former employee of the company in April 2022. The investigation also revealed other nondisclosure agreements related to misconduct claims by other women in the company against McMahon and executive John Laurinaitis, totaling $12 million. McMahon stepped down as CEO and chairman of WWE, but continued to oversee content development. He later announced his retirement on July 22, 2022, only to return six months later. By October 2022, the WWE had disclosed $19.6 million in unrecorded payments McMahon made to settle sexual misconduct claims between 2006 and 2022.

Chatterton and a separate tanning spa worker, who alleged that McMahon assaulted her in California in 2011, filed sexual abuse lawsuits against McMahon in December 2022. McMahon settled the lawsuit involving Chatterton that month, with his attorney stating that he maintains his innocence but settled to "avoid the cost of litigation". People familiar with the matter reported that McMahon agreed to a multimillion-dollar settlement with Chatterton. Though the exact sum of the settlement payment was not publicly disclosed, it has been acknowledged Chatterton sought $11.75 million in damages in her lawsuit.

Filmography

Championships and accomplishments 

 The Baltimore Sun
 Best Non-wrestling Performer of the Decade (2010)
 Professional Wrestling Hall of Fame and Museum
 Class of 2011
 Pro Wrestling Illustrated
 Feud of the Year (1996) vs. Eric Bischoff
 Feud of the Year (1998, 1999) vs. Stone Cold Steve Austin
 Feud of the Year (2001) vs. Shane McMahon
 Match of the Year (2006) vs. Shawn Michaels in a No Holds Barred match at WrestleMania 22
 World Wrestling Federation/World Wrestling Entertainment
 ECW World Championship (1 time)
 WWF Championship (1 time)
 Royal Rumble (1999)
 Wrestling Observer Newsletter awards
 Best Booker (1987, 1998, 1999)
 Best Promoter (1988, 1998–2000)
 Best Non-Wrestler (1999, 2000)
 Feud of the Year (1998, 1999) vs. Stone Cold Steve Austin
 Most Obnoxious (1983–1986, 1990, 1993)
 Worst Feud of the Year (2006) with Shane McMahon vs. D-Generation X (Shawn Michaels and Triple H)
 Wrestling Observer Newsletter Hall of Fame (Class of 1996)

Other awards and honors 
 Boys & Girls Clubs of America Hall of Fame (Class of 2015)
 Guinness World Records – Oldest WWE Champion (September 1999)
 Honorary Doctor of Humane Letters degree from Sacred Heart University
 Star on the Hollywood Walk of Fame (2008)

Luchas de Apuestas record

References

Citations

General sources 
  (via Google Books)

External links 

 WWE Corporate Profile
 
 

1945 births
20th-century American businesspeople
21st-century American businesspeople
American billionaires
American chairpersons of corporations
American chief executives
American color commentators
American football executives
American ice hockey administrators
American male professional wrestlers
American mass media owners
American people of Irish descent
American political fundraisers
American television talk show hosts
Businesspeople from Greenwich, Connecticut
Businesspeople from New York City
Businesspeople from North Carolina
ECW Heavyweight Champions/ECW World Heavyweight Champions
East Carolina University alumni
Fishburne Military School alumni
Internet memes
Living people
McMahon family
People acquitted of crimes
People from Manhattan
People from Pinehurst, North Carolina
People who faked their own death
People with dyslexia
Professional Wrestling Hall of Fame and Museum
Professional wrestlers billed from Connecticut
Professional wrestlers from North Carolina
Professional wrestling announcers
Professional wrestling authority figures
Professional wrestling trainers
The Authority (professional wrestling) members
WWE Champions
WWE executives
Wrestling Observer Newsletter award winners
XFL (2001)
XFL (2020) owners